Buick-Electra Playhouse is a 90-minute dramatic anthology series produced by and aired on CBS from 1959–1960.  It was sponsored by Buick.  There were a total of four episodes, all based on Ernest Hemingway's works, The Killers, The Fifth Column, The Snows of Kilimanjaro, and The Gambler, the Nun, and the Radio.

The executive producer was A.E. Hotchner, the producer was Gordon Duff, and the directors were John Frankenheimer, James Clarke, and Albert Marre.

Notable guest stars included Richard Burton, Maximilian Schell, Eleanor Parker, Robert Ryan, Dean Stockwell and Diane Baker.

External links

Buick-Electra Playhouse at CVTA

1959 American television series debuts
1960 American television series endings
1950s American anthology television series
1960s American anthology television series
CBS original programming